Bahramabad-e Sofla (also Romanized as Bahrāmābād-e Soflá; also known as Bahrāmābād-e Pā’īn, or simply Bahrāmābād and Behrāmābād) is a village in Zhan Rural District, in the Central District of Dorud County, Lorestan Province, Iran. At the 2006 census, its population was 324, in 63 families.

References 

Towns and villages in Dorud County